The Ghettos Tryin' to Kill Me! is the third studio album by Master P released on May 24, 1994 by No Limit Records and then later re-released in 1997 as a limited edition under Priority Records. The re-released album has King George and Rev. Do Wrong edited out, with some tracks removed altogether, but the 1997 limited edition also has two added bonus tracks, that are not found on the 1994 release. The album sold more than 200,000 copies.

Track listing 
The Ghettos Tryin to Kill Me!

References

Master P albums
1993 albums
No Limit Records albums